Stalag XVIII-D (also known as Stalag 306) was a German prisoner-of-war camp located in Maribor in German-occupied Yugoslavia (today in Slovenia). It opened in the spring or early summer of 1941, operating until the end of the war.

By July 1941 Stalag XVIII-D contained nearly 4,500 British and Commonwealth prisoners captured in Greece and Crete. Conditions initially were very poor, with more than 1,000 men accommodated in tents while huts were being constructed. There was an outbreak of typhus in early 1942. However the situation improved as the war went on.

Escapes assisted by Yugoslav Partisans became increasingly common, with most escapers being led south to the Partisan base and airfield at Semič in White Carniola. In August 1944, the largest mass rescue of POWs of the war in Europe took place when 105 Allied prisoners from a work camp administered by Stalag XVIII-D were freed by Partisans in the raid at Ožbalt.

Between August and November 1942 there was a second camp at Maribor, Stalag XVIII- B/Z.

Notes

References

External links 

World War II prisoner of war camps in Germany
World War II sites in Slovenia
Slovenia in World War II
Yugoslavia in World War II
History of Maribor